Jamia Masjid (Donga Bagh) is one of the biggest mosque in Sialkot, Punjab, Pakistan. It has a capacity of 5,000. It has two small and one large minarets; the second largest minaret in Sialkot. There is notable mirror work on front walls of the main prayer hall.

The mosque is situated in the main the area of Sialkot near Allama Iqbal Chowk. The mosque was founded with the help of generous contributions by renowned businessman of Sialkot Haji Muhammad Shafi and others. Haji Muhammad Shafi's and other contributors name is placed on a tablet in Jamia Mosque to acknowledge their generous contribution to build the mosque. Being located near Sialkot Railway Station, the mosque is adjacent to main markets of Sialkot city and this is the reason the Mosque always remains open for worshipers.

See also
 Sialkot

References

Mosques in Sialkot